The flag of Astana, the capital of Kazakhstan, was designed by the president of Kazakhstan, Nursultan Nazarbayev. The flag was adopted along with the coat of arms of Astana at the 16th session of the Maslikhat of Astana.

Historical flags

Notes

External links
 City of Astana flag at Astana.gov.kz
 

Flag
Flags of cities
2008 establishments in Kazakhstan
Astana
Astana